The abbreviation ROFC may refer to one of the following English football clubs:

 Radcliffe Olympic F.C.
 Rushall Olympic F.C.
 Russian Orthodox Free Church (see Russian Orthodox Autonomous Church)